Beyaz may refer to:
 Beyaz, Iran, a village in Kerman Province, Iran
 Beyaz Show, Turkish talk show
 Beyazıt Öztürk, the host, also known as Beyaz
 Beyaz peynir, Turkish cuisine
 Eren Beyaz, Turkish basketball player
 Beyaz (drug), an oral contraceptive 
Beyazıt Öztürk